The 2021–21 season of Ghanaian club West African Football Academy (WAFA). The season covered the period from 20 November 2020 to 8 August 2021.

Season overview 
West African Football Academy ended the 2020–21 season without a trophy after placing third  in the domestic the league and was knock out by Young Wise in the FA Cup

Technical team 
The technical team

Squad 
Squad

Pre-season and friendlies

The season was delayed as a result of COVID-19 pandemic in Ghana, causing the team to start preparations in September 2020.

Competitions

Premier League

League table

References 

West African Football Academy
2020–21 Ghana Premier League by team